Charles Henry Hopwood KC (20 July 1829 – 14 October 1904) was a British politician and judge. He was educated at King's College School and at King's College London. He was admitted to the Middle Temple on 2 November 1850 and was Called to the Bar on 6 June 1853. He served as Liberal Member of Parliament for Stockport from 1874 to 1885, and as Liberal MP for Middleton from 1892 to 1895.

Hopwood became QC in 1874. He was appointed Recorder of Liverpool in 1886. In politics he supported Irish Home Rule.

Hopwood was an anti-vaccinationist.

Selected publications

Speeches of Mr. P. A. Taylor and Mr. C. H. Hopwood on Vaccination: In the House of Commons (1883)

References

External links 
 

1829 births
1904 deaths
People educated at King's College School, London
Alumni of King's College London
Liberal Party (UK) MPs for English constituencies
UK MPs 1874–1880
UK MPs 1880–1885
UK MPs 1892–1895
Members of the Middle Temple
19th-century King's Counsel
Members of the Parliament of the United Kingdom for Stockport